Guy (died 19 October 1175), was count of Nevers and Auxerre. He was the son of William III, Count of Nevers and Ida of Sponheim. He married Matilda, granddaughter of Duke Hugh II of Burgundy, just prior to his leaving for the holy land.

Guy succeeded his brother William IV in 1168. He died in 1175 and was succeeded by his son, William, whilst his wife Mathilde would be regent of Nevers.

Children
Guy and Matilda had three children:
William V, Count of Nevers
Agnes I, Countess of Nevers
Ida

Notes

References

1175 deaths
12th-century French people
Counts of Nevers